Inre Mjoögrunden consists of 10 Swedish islands belonging to the Piteå archipelago. The small archipelago lies north of Mjoön. The islands do not have a connection to the mainland. There are small houses on the biggest island.

References 

Swedish islands in the Baltic
Landforms of Norrbotten County